The discography of British post-disco/funk band Imagination consists of 7 studio albums, 13 compilation albums, 3 remix albums, and 7 video releases.

Albums

Studio albums

Remix albums

Compilation albums

Singles

Videos

Video releases

Music videos

Notes

References

Discographies of British artists
Pop music group discographies
Disco discographies